Pierre Lacans (23 April 1957 – 30 September 1985) was a French rugby league and rugby union footballer who played in the 1970s and 1980s. He played club level rugby league (RL) for Lézignan Sangliers, and representative level rugby union (RU) for France, and at club level for AS Béziers, as a flanker, i.e. number 6 or 7.

Background
Pierre Lacans was born in Conilhac-Corbières, France, and he was killed in a traffic accident.

Honours
 Selected to represent France, 1980–1982
 Grand Slam : 1981
 French rugby champion, 1978, 1980, 1981, 1983, 1984 with AS Béziers
 Challenge Yves du Manoir 1975 and 1977 with AS Béziers

External links
 Statistics at en.espn.co.uk (RU)

1957 births
1985 deaths
AS Béziers Hérault players
France international rugby union players
French rugby league players
French rugby union players
Lézignan Sangliers players
Rugby union flankers
Sportspeople from Aude